

Events
New York gangster Albert Anastasia moves to Palisades Park, New Jersey, where he becomes an associate of Joe Adonis and meets regularly with other New Jersey organized crime figures such as Anthony "Tony Bender" Strollo and the Moretti brothers.
Jacob "Gurrah" Shapiro dies in prison while serving a life sentence. Shapiro had been a leader of the Murder Inc. organization in New York.
Carl Shelton, co-founder of the Prohibition-era Shelton Gang, is murdered by former gang member Frank "Buster" Wortman.
Edwin Rogers Lowenstein, supported by Cleveland mobsters Moe Dalitz and Morris Kleinman, establishes bookmaking operations under E.R. Lowe & Co. with Harold Fischer and Fred Kreisler in Tucson, Arizona and Albuquerque, New Mexico This becomes one of the earliest syndicate criminal activities in the Southwestern United States and is eventually known as the "Tucson Front".  The Tucson Front would later include front businesses such as the hotel chain run by George Gordon.
January 8 – Andy Hintz, a New York stevedore and local waterfront hiring boss, is shot six times and severely wounded by three unidentified men while leaving his Greenwich Village apartment. Hintz survives the shooting and identifies his assailants as longshoreman John M. "Cockeye" Dunn, Andrew "Squint" Sheridan and Danny Gentile.  On January 29, Hintz would finally die from his wounds.
January 25 – Al Capone dies of a cerebral hemorrhage in his Miami, Florida estate as a result of advanced syphilis.
February 22 – U.S. mob boss Charles "Lucky" Luciano is arrested by Cuban authorities under pressure from the United States Government.  Deported to Italy after World War II, Luciano had become a Cuban resident October 1946.  While in Cuba, Luciano was reportedly in contact with high ranking U.S. organized crime figures including Vito Genovese, Frank Costello, Albert Anastasia, Tony Accardo, Carlos Marcello and Meyer Lansky. On March 20, Cuba would deport Luciano back to Italy.
March 27 - Thomas Buffa, a drug trafficker and associate of Tony Lopiparo, is killed in Lodi, California.
May 1 – At the labour parade in Portella della Ginestra, Sicily, 11 people are killed and over thirty are wounded. The attack would later be attributed to Salvatore Giuliano, the Sicilian bandit and separatist leader. Mafia leaders like Calogero Vizzini had initially supported Guiliano and his separatist movement. However, when it became clear that Sicily would never achieve independence,  Vizzini changed sides and joined the Italian Christian Democrat (DC – Democrazia Cristiana) party.  Bernardo Mattarella, one of the party’s leaders, had welcomed Vizzini in a 1945 article in the Catholic newspaper Il Popolo.  Vizzini’s support for the DC would never be a secret. During the crucial 1948 elections that would decide Italy’s post-war future, Vizzini and Mafia boss Giuseppe Genco Russo would share a table with leading DC politicians attending an electoral lunch. In 1950, Vizzini would allegedly help Italian police capture and kill Giuliano.
May 5 – The "Black Diamond Meeting" is held in New Orleans to name a successor to "Silver Dollar" Sam Carolla, who would soon be deported from the United States.  Attendees include Carolla underboss Frank Todaro; capos Thomas Rizzuto, Nick Grifazzi, Joseph Capro and Frank Lombardino; Carolla's son Anthony Carolla, and Carlos Marcello.  During this meeting, Carolla passes his leadership role to Todaro.  However, by 1950 underboss Carlos Marcello would control organized crime in New Orleans.
May 7/9 – Nicholas DeJohn, a Chicago mobster and San Francisco crime leader, is found strangled to death in the trunk of a car in San Francisco. Leonard Calamia, a syndicate gunman and known drug trafficker, is charged with his murder, but is later acquitted.
June 20 – Mobster Benjamin Siegel is killed by an unidentified gunman at the Beverly Hills, California home of girlfriend Virginia Hill. Siegal had built The Flamingo hotel and casino in Las Vegas using millions of dollars in Mafia money.
September 20 – New York Mayor Fiorello La Guardia, a major opponent of organized crime, dies of cancer.

Arts and literature
The Gangster (film)  starring Barry Sullivan.

Births
Domenico Cefalu "Italian Dom", Gambino crime family underboss
September 5 – Kiyoshi Takayama, a prominent yakuza related to the Kodo-kai and its parent syndicate, the Yamaguchi-gumi
September 22 – Salvatore Vitale "Good Looking Sal", Bonanno crime family member
 October 4 – Roy Francis Adkins, English gangster and drug trafficker

Deaths
Jacob Shapiro "Gurrah", New York mobster and labor racketeer
25 January – Al Capone "Scarface", Chicago Outfit leader
March 27 - Thomas Buffa, drug trafficker and associate of Tony Lopiparo
May 9 – Nicholas DeJohn, San Francisco crime leader and Chicago Outfit member
20 June – Benjamin "Bugsy Siegel, New York mobster, Las Vegas casino manager, and member of the National Crime Syndicate
September 20 – Fiorello La Guardia, Mayor of New York

References

Organized crime
Years in organized crime